Tajuria iapyx is a butterfly endemic to the island of Sulawesi. It was described by William Chapman Hewitson in 1865.

Subspecies
 T. i. iapyx (Sulawesi)
 T. i. banggaianus Ribbe, 1926 (Banggai)

References

External links
 "Butterflies of Southeastern Sulawesi". Systematics of Neotropical Butterflies. University of Florida.

Tajuria
Butterflies described in 1865
Butterflies of Indonesia
Taxa named by William Chapman Hewitson